Oliver Frey (30 June 1948 – 21 August 2022) was a Swiss artist, who was based in the United Kingdom. He was known for his book and magazine illustrations, especially for British computer magazines of the 1980s. Under the pen name Zack, he became known for his erotic illustrations and erotic comics in British gay male porn magazines of the 1970s and 1980s.

Early life 
Frey was born in Zürich, Switzerland, on 30 June 1948. He grew up fluent in Italian and German. His family moved to Britain in 1956 but subsequently returned to Switzerland. During his high school years in Switzerland, Frey enrolled in the American Famous Artists School correspondence course.

Career 
After spending six months in the Swiss army and dropping out of Berne University, Frey moved back to Britain and started a two-year course at the London Film School, during which he supported himself with freelance work, including illustrating War Picture Library comic books. As a child Frey had loved The Eagle comics magazine, and as an adult worked on the 1980s revival, drawing the strip Dan Dare. Also during the 1970s, he illustrated for IPC Media's Look and Learn magazine, including the strip The Trigan Empire. He was commissioned to create 1930s-era comic book art for the pre-title sequence of the 1978 movie Superman.

Through the late 1970s and the 1980s Frey was a prolific creator of gay erotic art, usually published under the pen name Zack. These included a comics series featuring a big, muscular bad-boy hero named "Rogue" for HIM Magazine, a monthly gay male pornography publication which he and his partner Roger Kean owned, along with related titles. He also produced, edited, and illustrated several issues of Man-to-Man Magazine. Frey illustrated twelve of the HIM Libraries, the first two written by Kean, the remainder by various authors who submitted manuscripts. The company was raided by the police in 1981, and all of its stock was destroyed under then-current laws. His gay pornographic work was also featured on front covers and in volumes of the Meatmen series of gay erotic comics. Russell T. Davies, writer of the British television series Queer as Folk, praised Frey's serial "The Street" as an important influence on his ground-breaking gay TV drama.

When Roger Kean and Frey's brother Franco founded the computer magazine CRASH in 1983, Oliver Frey became the magazine's illustrator. He went on to illustrate for CRASHs sister magazines Zzap!64, Amtix, and The Games Machine. He illustrated the comic strip "Terminal Man", written by Kelvin Gosnell, which was serialised in both CRASH and Zzap!64 in 1984, and published as a complete story in a large format book in 1988.

During the late 90s, Frey worked as publishing director for Thalamus Publishing in Shropshire, which specialised in illustrated historical reference titles. Thalamus Publishing went into receivership in August 2009. Frey and Kean formed Reckless Books in Ludlow, specialising in young adult action-adventure, historical, and gay adult reading.

Several of Frey's painted front covers for Fleetway and IPC War Picture Libraries were reproduced from the original art in two of David Roach's books, Aaargh! It's War in 2007, and The Art of War in 2008. Frey is the illustrator of over 16 books under the name Oliver Frey and over 12 under the pseudonym Zack. Classic video gaming magazine Retro Gamer has featured Frey's artwork on its cover. In July and August 2014 his gay erotic work was included in an exhibition at the British Library, where he was interviewed by novelist and reporter Rupert Smith.

Personal life 
Frey lived with his long-time partner Roger Kean in the United Kingdom. He died on 21 August 2022, at the age of 74.

Selected bibliography

As Oliver Frey 
 Dan Dare:
 "Return of the Mekon" (in Eagle #17–18, 1982)
 "Belendotor" (in Eagle #84–83, 1983)
 Roger Kean: The Fantasy Art of Oliver Frey (Thalamus Publishing, 2006), 
 Oliver Frey, Artist The Terminal Man (Reckless Books, 2012) 
 Roger Kean, Author; Oliver Frey, Illustrator Living in the Ancient World Set (Chelsea House Publications. 2008)  
 Oliver Frey, Illustrator Exciting Stories Of Fantasy and the Future (Hamlyn 1982) 
 Roger Kean, Author; Oliver Frey, Illustrator The Complete Chronicle of the Emperors Of Rome (Thalamus Publishing, 2005)   
 Chris Wilkins and Roger Kean, Authors, Oliver Frey, Illustrator Ocean, The History (Apple 2014)
 Roger Kean, Author; Oliver Frey, Illustrator Forgotten power: Byzantium: Bulwark of Christianity (Reckless Books, 2013)

As Zack 

 Twisted Blade in the Arena (Bruno Gmunder Verlag 2017) 
 Desert Studs (Bruno Gmunder Verlag 2014) 
 The Satyr of Capri (Bruno Gmunder Verlag 2015) 
 Deadly Circus of Desire (Bruno Gmunder Verlag 2014) 
 The Warrior's Boy (Bruno Gmunder Verlag 2013) 
 The Wrath of Seth (Bruno Gmunder Verlag 2016) 
 Zack: The Art (Bruno Gmunder Verlag, 2012) 
 Bike Boy (Bruno Gmünder Group, 2010) 
 Hot For Boys: The Sexy Adventures Of Rogue (Bruno Gmünder Group, 2011)  
 Bike Boy Rides Again (Bruno Gmünder Group, 2012) 
 Boys of Vice City (The Adventures of Gil Graham & Mike Smith #1) (Bruno Gmünder Group, 2011) 

 Boys of Two Cities (Bruno Gmunder Verlag 2012) 

 Raw Recruits (Bruno Gmunder Verlag 2013)

References

External links 
 Lambiek Comiclopedia biography

1948 births
2022 deaths
Gay male erotica artists
LGBT comics creators
Pseudonymous artists
Swiss comics artists
British comics artists
British erotic artists
Swiss erotic artists
Swiss illustrators
British illustrators
Artists from Zürich
20th-century Swiss artists
21st-century Swiss artists
20th-century British artists
21st-century British artists